Calvary Baptist Church is a historic church in the Ocean View section of Dennis Township, Cape May County, New Jersey, United States.

It was built in 1855 in a Gothic style and was added to the National Register of Historic Places in 1980.

See also
National Register of Historic Places listings in Cape May County, New Jersey

References

External links

Baptist churches in New Jersey
Churches on the National Register of Historic Places in New Jersey
Carpenter Gothic church buildings in New Jersey
Churches completed in 1855
19th-century Baptist churches in the United States
Churches in Cape May County, New Jersey
National Register of Historic Places in Cape May County, New Jersey
Dennis Township, New Jersey
New Jersey Register of Historic Places